Tan Joe Hok (Indonesian name: Hendra Kartanegara, ; born 11 August 1937) is an Indonesian former badminton player, who along with Ferry Sonneville and a cadre of fine doubles players set the foundation for an Indonesian badminton dynasty by dethroning then-perennial Thomas Cup champion Malaya in 1958.

Tan Joe Hok lived in Bandung until he finished high school. He received his degree in Chemistry and Biology from Baylor University, Texas, United States.

He was the first Indonesian to win the All England Open in 1959 and the first Indonesian to win a gold medal in Asian Games, which happened at home in 1962. He won both the U.S. Open and Canadian Open singles titles consecutively in 1959 and 1960. He has many other notable achievements in the badminton field, both as a player and a coach, most particularly, winning all but one of his singles matches for Indonesia's world champion Thomas Cup (men's international) teams of 1958, 1961, and 1964.

Personal
He married former badminton player Goei Kiok Nio in 1965 and they have two children. Tan Joe Hok had a difficulty establishing full citizenship in Indonesia because he could not obtain an SBKRI, a mandatory document for non-indigenous and especially Chinese-Indonesian during the U.S.-backed dictatorship of Suharto. He said, "It wouldn't be hard for us to move overseas but we don't want to do that because we are Indonesians. Even if it was raining gold overseas, we will remain here, in the land where Indonesian blood has been spilled."

Education
Elementary school, Junior High School and Senior High School at Bandung
Premed in Chemistry & Biology Baylor University, Texas, United States (1959–1963)

Career and achievements
 Won the National Championships at Surabaya (1956)
 Member of Squad Indonesian Team that won the Thomas Cup at Singapore (1958)
 First Indonesian badminton men's player to win All England (1959)
 First Indonesian badminton men's player to win Asian Games gold medal (1962)
 Member of Squad Team Thomas Cup Indonesia (1964–1967)
 Badminton coach at Mexico (1969–1970)
 Badminton coach at Hong Kong (1971)
 Coach of Indonesia Thomas Cup Team at Kuala Lumpur (1984)
 Badminton coach at PB Djarum Kudus
 Mandala Pest Control Director (since 1973)
 Best Sport Coach by SIWO/PWI Jaya version (1984)

Asian Games 

Men's singles

Men's doubles

International Open Tournaments (9 titles, 5 runners-up) 

Men's singles

Men's doubles

Mixed doubles

See also 
 Famous Indonesian Chinese
 Indonesian Chinese
 Asian Games
 All England Open Badminton Championships

References

External links 
 (id) Tan Joe Hok, Tenar setelah Mengalahkan Kiem Bie
 (id) Tan Joe Hok, Bangga Jadi Kebanggaan Bangsa 
 (en) Tan Joe Hok assails discrimination
 (en) Tan Joe Hok's citizenship saga

1937 births
Living people
Sportspeople from Bandung
Indonesian sportspeople of Chinese descent
Indonesian male badminton players
Baylor University alumni
Asian Games medalists in badminton
Badminton players at the 1962 Asian Games
Asian Games gold medalists for Indonesia
Asian Games silver medalists for Indonesia
Badminton coaches
Medalists at the 1962 Asian Games
20th-century Indonesian people